Slitherine Software UK Limited is a British video game developer and publisher founded on 25 June 2000. It is responsible for the production of a range of over 200 strategy and war video games for  PC, Xbox 360, Xbox One, PS2, PS3, PS4, Wii, DS, iOS, Android and Mac. It also produces rules for a series of tabletop wargames called Field of Glory.

Slitherine merged with Matrix Games in 2010. Slitherine works with the US military and defense contractors to supply simulation software. The primary simulation is a professional version of the commercial game Command Modern Air & Naval Operations. In 2014, Slitherine Group acquired Shenandoah Studio, American developer of Battle of the Bulge and Drive on Moscow.

Slitherine developed and/or published a number of licensed games with brands including Battlestar Galactica, Warhammer 40,000, Heroes of Normandie, Horrible Histories and the History Channel.

Games 

A full list of games can be found on the publisher site. Notable games include:

Tabletop wargames 

Alongside their video games, Slitherine publishes a series of manuals for their tabletop wargame Field of Glory.  The game is primarily set in the Ancient and Medieval time periods of European and Middle Eastern History. There are also plans to expand the game to include the Renaissance and Napoleonic Wars. Each new setting will have its own rules system and set of companion books.

References

External links

Slitherine Ltd. at MobyGames

2000 establishments in England
Companies based in Surrey
Epsom
Video game companies of the United Kingdom
Video game companies established in 2000
Video game development companies
Video game publishers